Mohiabad (also Romanized as Moḩīābād) is a village in Azadegan Rural District, in the Central District of Rafsanjan County, Kerman Province, Iran. At the 2006 census, its population was 271, in 64 families.

References 

Populated places in Rafsanjan County